Paolo Taviani (born 8 November 1931) and Vittorio Taviani (20 September 1929 – 15 April 2018), collectively referred to as the Taviani brothers, were Italian film directors and screenwriters who collaborated on film productions.

At the Cannes Film Festival, the Taviani brothers won the Palme d'Or and the FIPRESCI prize for Padre Padrone in 1977 and the Grand Prix du Jury for La notte di San Lorenzo (The Night of the Shooting Stars, 1982). In 2012 they won the Golden Bear at the Berlin International Film Festival with Caesar Must Die.

Vittorio Taviani died on 15 April 2018 at the age of 88.

Career

Both born in San Miniato, Tuscany, Italy, the Taviani brothers began their careers as journalists. In 1960 they came to the world of cinema, directing with Joris Ivens the documentary L'Italia non è un paese povero (Italy is not a poor country). They went on to direct two films with Valentino Orsini, Un uomo da bruciare (A Man to Burn) (1962) and I fuorilegge del matrimonio (Outlaws of Marriage) (1963).

Their first autonomous film was I sovversivi (The Subversives, 1967), with which they anticipated the events of 1968. With actor Gian Maria Volonté they gained attention with Sotto il segno dello scorpione (Under the Sign of Scorpio, (1969) where one can see the echoes of Brecht, Pasolini, and Godard.

In 1971, they co-signed the media campaign against Milan's police commissioner Luigi Calabresi, published in the magazine L'espresso.

The revolutionary theme is present both in  San Michele aveva un gallo (1971), an adaptation of Tolstoy's novel The Divine and the Human, a film greatly appreciated by critics, and in the film Allonsanfan (1974), in which Marcello Mastroianni has a role as an ex-revolutionary who has served a long term in prison and now views his idealistic youth in a much more realistic light, and nevertheless gets entangled in a new attempt in which he no longer believes.

Their next film Padre Padrone (1977) (Palme d'Or at the Cannes Film Festival), taken from a novel by Gavino Ledda, speaks of the struggle of a Sardinian shepherd against the cruel rules of his patriarchal society. In Il prato (1979) there are nonrealistic echoes, while La notte di San Lorenzo (The Night of the Shooting Stars, 1982) narrates, in a fairy-tale tone, a marginal event in the days before the end of World War II, in Tuscany, as seen through the eyes of some village people. The film was awarded the Special Jury Award in Cannes.

Kaos (1984)—another literary adaptation—is a poignantly beautiful and poetical film in episodes, taken from Luigi Pirandello's Short Stories for a year. In Il sole anche di notte (1990) the Taviani brothers transposed in 18th century Naples the story from Tolstoy's Father Sergius.

From then onwards, the Tavianis' inspiration proved faltering. Successes like Le affinità elettive, (1996, from Goethe) and an attempt to woo the international audiences like Good morning Babilonia, (1987), on the pioneers of cinema history, alternate with lesser films like Fiorile (1993) and Tu ridi (1996), inspired by the characters and short stories of  Pirandello.

In the 2000s, the brothers turned successfully to directing television films and miniseries, such as Leo Tolstoy's Resurrection (2001) and Alexandre Dumas's Luisa Sanfelice (2004), as well as La masseria delle allodole (2007), presented at the Berlin Film Festival in the section 'Berlinale Special'.

Their film Caesar Must Die won the Golden Bear at the 62nd Berlin International Film Festival in February 2012. The film was also selected as the Italian entry for the Best Foreign Language Oscar at the 85th Academy Awards, but it did not make the final shortlist.

On 15 April 2018, Vittorio Taviani died in Rome after a long illness at the age of 88.

Filmography

As film directors

San Miniato, luglio '44 (1954)
L'Italia non è un paese povero (together with Joris Ivens, 1960)
Un uomo da bruciare (together with Valentino Orsini, 1962)
I fuorilegge del matrimonio (together with Valentino Orsini, 1963)
I sovversivi (1967)
Sotto il segno dello scorpione (1969)
San Michele aveva un gallo (1972)
Allonsanfàn (1974)
Padre Padrone (1977)
Il prato (1979)
La notte di San Lorenzo (1982)
Kaos (1984)
Good Morning, Babylon (1987)
Il sole anche di notte (1990)
Fiorile (1993)
Le affinità elettive (1996)
Tu ridi (1998)
Resurrezione (TV film, 2001)
La primavera del 2002 - L'Italia protesta, l'Italia si ferma (2002), collectively made with 46 other directors
Luisa Sanfelice (TV miniseries, 2004)
La masseria delle allodole (2007)
Caesar Must Die (2012)
Wondrous Boccaccio (2015)
Una questione privata (2017)
Leonora addio (2021, first film directed only by Paolo Taviani)

As screenwriters

San Miniato, luglio '44 (with Valentino Orsini and Cesare Zavattini, 1954)
Un uomo da bruciare (with Valentino Orsini, 1962)
I fuorilegge del matrimonio (with Lucio Battistrada, Giuliani G. De Negri, Renato Niccolai and Valentino Orsini, 1963)
I sovversivi (1967)
Sotto il segno dello scorpione (1969)
San Michele aveva un gallo (based on a story by Leo Tolstoy, 1972)
Allonsanfàn (1973)
Padre padrone (based on a book by Gavino Ledda, 1977)
Il prato (with Gianni Sbarra, 1979)
La notte di San Lorenzo (with Giuliani G. De Negri and Tonino Guerra, 1982)
Kaos (based on short stories by Luigi Pirandello, 1984)
Good Morning, Babylon (with Tonino Guerra, 1987)
Il sole anche di notte (with Tonino Guerra, based on Father Sergius by Tolstoy, 1990)
Fiorile (with Sandro Petraglia, 1993)
Le affinità elettive (based on Elective Affinities by Goethe, 1996)
Tu ridi (based on short stories by Pirandello, 1998)
Resurrezione (based on Resurrection by Tolstoy, 2001)
Luisa Sanfelice (based on La Sanfelice by Alexandre Dumas, père, 2004)
Una questione privata (based on A Private Matter by Beppe Fenoglio, 2017)

Awards

1977: Palme d'or at Cannes Film Festival for Padre Padrone - Father and Master.
1977: Grand Prix for Padre Padrone - Father and Master, Berlin International Film Festival 
1978: Special David di Donatello for Padre Padrone - Father and Master.
1982: Grand Prix at Cannes Film Festival for The Night of the Shooting Stars.
1983: David di Donatello for Best Film and David di Donatello for Best Director for The Night of the Shooting Stars.
1984: Italian Golden Globes Golden Globe for Best Film for The Night of the Shooting Stars.
1985: Italian Golden Globes Golden Globe for Best Film for Kaos.
1985: David di Donatello for Best Script for Kaos.
1986: Leone d'Oro (Golden Lion) Life Career of the Venice International Film Festival.
2002: Golden St. George at the 24th Moscow International Film Festival for Resurrection
2005: Italian Golden Globes Career Prize 
2007: Efebo d'oro for La Masseria delle Allodole.
2008: Laurea honoris causa in "Cinema, Theatre and Multimedia Production" by the Faculty of Literature and Philosophy of the University of Pisa.
2012: Golden Bear and Prize of the Ecumenical Jury - Berlin International Film Festival for Caesar Must Die.
2012: David di Donatello for Best Film and David di Donatello for Best Director for Caesar Must Die.

References

External links

1929 births
1931 births
David di Donatello winners
Nastro d'Argento winners
Italian film directors
Italian screenwriters
Italian male screenwriters
People from San Miniato
Sibling filmmakers
Sibling duos
Directors of Palme d'Or winners
Directors of Golden Bear winners
2018 deaths
Italian communists